The Lost Honour of Katharina Blum, or: how violence develops and where it can lead (original German title:) is a 1974 novel by Heinrich Böll.

The story deals with the sensationalism of tabloid news and the political climate of panic over Red Army Faction terrorism in the 1970s in the Federal Republic of Germany. The main character, Katharina Blum, is an innocent housekeeper whose life is ruined by an invasive tabloid reporter and a police investigation when the man with whom she has just fallen in love turns out to be wanted by the police because of a bank robbery. The book's fictional tabloid paper, Die Zeitung (The Newspaper), is modelled on the actual German Bild-Zeitung.

Plot

Four days after a Weiberfastnacht's eve party (Wed. 20 February 1974), where Katharina Blum met a man named Ludwig Götten, she calls on Oberkommissar Moeding and confesses to killing a journalist for the newspaper Die Zeitung.

Katharina had met Götten at a friend's party and spent the night with him before helping him to escape from the police. The next morning, the police break into her house, arrest her and question her.  The story is sensationally covered by Die Zeitung, and in particular its journalist Tötges. Tötges investigates everything about her life, calling on Katharina's friends and family, including her ex-husband and hospitalized mother, who dies the day after Tötges visits her. He paints a picture of Katharina as a fervent accomplice of Götten, and as a communist run amok in Germany.

Katharina arranges an interview with Tötges.  According to Katharina, upon his arrival he suggests that they have sex, whereupon she shoots him dead.  She then wanders the city for a few hours before driving to police headquarters and confessing to murder.

The book also details the effects of the case on Katharina's employers and friends the Blornas; Mr Blorna is her lawyer, and Mrs Blorna one of the designers of the apartment block where Katharina resides.  Their association with Katharina leads to their exclusion from society.

Style

The story is written from a first-person plural perspective, as if the narrator were presenting a confidential report to the reader on the basis of sources.  The technique is documentary, as with Group Portrait with Lady, but with a much more disciplined focus on essentials.  The reader is sometimes left to infer who the sources are for many of the reports, and even to wonder whether the narrator may not be one of the characters in the novel.  This way, the narrator is dependent on characters and the information they impart, becoming a researcher and critic of his source material. This is implicitly contrasted with the journalists who irresponsibly distort their sources.  The attack on vulgar journalism is thus mounted from the perspective of a narrator whose moral authority is enhanced by the use of the 'regal' first-person plural form. In some parts of the story, the elaborate and detached manner is also used for comic effect when retelling violent, silly or emotionally conflicted incidents as more and more personal secrets of the characters are revealed.

Adaptations
The book has been adapted into the following works:
 The Lost Honour of Katharina Blum, a 1975 film adaptation of Böll's novel directed by Volker Schlöndorff and Margarethe von Trotta and starring Angela Winkler as Blum, Mario Adorf as Kommissar Beizmenne, Dieter Laser as Tötges and Jürgen Prochnow as Ludwig
 The Lost Honor of Kathryn Beck, a 1984 TV movie starring Marlo Thomas as Blum and Kris Kristofferson as Ben Cole
 Heinrich Böll - The Lost Honour of Katharina Blum, a radio dramatisation in five parts broadcast as the 15 Minute Drama of the week (formerly the Woman's Hour Drama) on BBC Radio Four for the week commencing 15 October 2012
 Katharina Blum, an opera adaptation by Tilo Medek to a libretto by his wife Dorothea based on the Böll novel, which premiered at the Theater Bielefeld on 20 April 1991

See also
Le Monde 100 Books of the Century

References

General

 

 Beth, Hanno. "Rufmord und Mord: die publizistische Dimension der Gewalt. Zu Heinrich Bölls Erzählung 'Die verlorene Ehre der Katharina Blum.'" "Heinrich Böll. Eine Einführung in das Gesamtwerk in Einzelinterpretationen. Ed. Hanno Beth. 2nd ed. Königstein, 1980. 69–95.

1974 German novels
Novels by Heinrich Böll
Novels about terrorists
Cultural depictions of the Red Army Faction
Novels about journalism
Works about tabloid journalism
German novels adapted into films
Bild
Novels adapted into operas
Kiepenheuer & Witsch books